Smallburgh Fen is a  biological Site of Special Scientific Interest in Smallburgh in Norfolk, United Kingdom It is part of the Broadland Ramsar site and Special Protection Area, and The Broads Special Area of Conservation. It is also a Nature Conservation Review site, Grade 2. 

This spring-fed fen site is in the valley of a tributary of the River Ant. The diverse flora includes several rare species, including the only known locality in the county for the moss Bracthythecium mildeanum. There is also an area of alder carr.

There is access to the site by a short track from Union Street.

References

Sites of Special Scientific Interest in Norfolk
Nature Conservation Review sites
Ramsar sites in England
Special Protection Areas in England
Special Areas of Conservation in England